Cymadothea trifolii is a fungal plant pathogen infecting the red clover.

External links 
 Index Fungorum
 USDA ARS Fungal Database

References 

Fungal plant pathogens and diseases
Mycosphaerellaceae
Fungi described in 1935